The relationship between Christianity and politics is a historically complex subject and a frequent source of disagreement throughout the history of Christianity, as well as in modern politics between the Christian right and Christian left. There have been a wide variety of ways in which thinkers have conceived of the relationship between Christianity and politics, with many arguing that Christianity directly supports a particular political ideology or philosophy. Along these lines, various thinkers have argued for Christian communism, Christian socialism, Christian nationalism, Christian anarchism, Christian libertarianism, or Christian democracy. Others believe that Christians should have little interest or participation in politics or government.

History

Antiquity 

Early Christianity was most prominent in the Roman Empire, where it was illegal to practice Christianity and persecution of Christians took place. The first state to recognize Christianity as its official religion was the Kingdom of Armenia in 301. Christianity gained prominence in Roman politics during the reign of Constantine the Great, who favored Christianity and legalized its practice in the empire in 313. Christians were also appointed to government positions at this time. In 380, Trinitarian Christianity was made the official religion of the Roman Empire by Theodosius I. The first major instance of Christianity wielding power in politics took place in 390. After the Massacre of Thessalonica, the bishop of Milan forbade Emperor Theodosius the Eucharist until he repented, and Theodosius complied.

Early Christians were described by Celsus as those who refused military service and would not accept public office, nor assume any responsibility for the governing of cities. Origen confirms this description and adds that Christians do more for the good of the empire by forming an "army of piety" that prays for the well-being of the emperor and the safety of the empire. It has been argued that Christianity made a significant positive contribution to the development of modern democracy.

The organizational structure of the Roman church was defined to align with that of the Roman government, and the five major hubs of the Roman Empire also became those of the church as the Pentarchy.

Middle Ages 

Christianity dominated European politics in the Middle Ages. During the fall of the Western Roman Empire, the Pope effectively served as the political leader of the region. The Byzantine Empire continued to be the center of the church in the East. In 800, Charlemagne was crowned by Pope Leo III as the Emperor of the Romans, establishing a precedent of interdependence of the church with the Carolingian Empire, and eventually, the Holy Roman Empire.

The church also maintained strong influence over the other kingdoms of Europe. Secular rulers would support missionary efforts in order to enlarge their realms. Bishops and abbots were not only church leaders, but often also large land-owning princes and thus vassals of secular feudal lords. The line dividing church and state interests was not always clear. The church also ruled its own territory directly in the form of the Papal States.

The most notable instances of the church exercising influence over the kingdoms were the Crusades, when it called the Christian kingdoms to arms to fight religious wars. Some Crusades aimed to recover and secure Jerusalem and the Holy Land from the Muslims (1095-1291); other Crusades attacked the Cathari (1209-1229), and the Teutonic Knights and their supporters fought against non-Catholics (including Eastern Orthodox Christians) in the Baltic Sea area (1147-1410). In Spain, the Crusader mindset continued for several centuries after the last crusade in the Middle East, in the form of the Reconquista, a series of wars (711-1492) fought to recover the Iberian peninsula from the Muslim Moors. These latter wars were local affairs, and the participation of the entire armed body of Catholics - let alone Orthodox Christianity - was only theoretical.

The church expressed periodic unease with the fact that, in the absence of central imperial rule, Christian princes made war against each other. Church councils attempted to limit the volume and permitted times of warfare from 989 onwards by proclaiming the Truce of God, which sought to set limits upon the times and places where warfare could be conducted, and to protect Christian non-combatants from the hazards of war.

Reformation 

The Reformation caused a political backlash in the Holy Roman Empire. In response, the Diet of Worms was assembled, and promotion of Lutheranism was made illegal. The English Reformation was deeply influenced by English politics. When the church refused to grant an annulment to the marriage of Henry VIII, he formed the Anglican tradition through the Church of England under the political rule of the crown.

Scripture 

Politics is addressed directly or indirectly in several parts of the Bible. Romans 13:1 and 1 Peter 2:13-14 say that all should follow the authority of government, as government authority is instituted by the authority of God. LGBT are challenged with Romans 1:26-27 and Leviticus 18:22, which describe same-sex behavior as unnatural and detestable, respectively. Matthew 19:3-6 describes marriage as between a man and a woman, and 1 Corinthians 6:9-10 says that homosexual offenders will not inherit the kingdom of God. The abortion debate is influenced by Exodus 21:22-25, which demands a penalty for the action of killing a fetus by mistake. Other verses relevant to the idea of fetal personhood include Psalm 139:13-16 and Jeremiah 1:5.

The Hebrew Bible contains a complex chronicle of the Kings of Israel and Judah, written over the course of many generations by authors whose relationships and intimacy with the rulers of the several kingdoms fluctuated widely in both intimacy and respect. Some historical passages of the Hebrew Bible contain intimate portrayals of the inner workings of the royal households of Saul, David and Solomon. The accounts of subsequent monarchs are frequently more distanced and less detailed and frequently begin with the judgment that the monarch "did evil in the sight of the Lord". The Christian New Testament instead begins with the story of Jesus, crucified as a criminal who had offended both the Jewish priesthood and the Roman imperial authorities. At least to outward appearances, Jesus was at the periphery of political life and power in the Roman province of Judea.

Denominations

Catholicism 

The Catholic Church is deeply intertwined with the history of European politics. It developed alongside the status of Christianity as the official religion of the Roman Empire and persisted through the Middle Ages as one of the most powerful political forces in Europe. In 2015, Pope Francis stated that Catholics have a duty to participate in politics to improve the world. The Catholic Church does not officially take political stances and encourages followers to come to their own political decisions, but it also states that these decisions must be made in accordance with natural law.

The Catholic Church in the United States has sought to discipline Catholic politicians that take pro-choice stances on abortion, most notably President Joe Biden. Conservative, moderate, and liberal Catholics all have a major presence in the United States.

Catholicism and war 

Catholics historically have had a wide variety of positions on issues of war and peace. The historical peace churches are now the chief exponents of Christian pacifism, but this was an issue that first came to light during the Roman Empire.

Soldiers in the Roman military who converted to Roman Catholicism were among the first who had to face these issues. Catholics in the Roman military had to confront a number of issues, that go beyond the obvious one about whether war could be reconciled with the Christian religion. Paganism saturated Roman military institutions. Idols of the Greco-Roman gods appeared on the legionary standards. Military service involved oaths of loyalty that might contradict Catholic teachings even if they did not invoke pagan gods. The duties of Roman military personnel included law enforcement as well as defense, and as such Roman soldiers were sometimes obliged to participate in the persecution of Christians themselves. Sexual licentiousness was considered to be a moral hazard to which military personnel were exposed. See Imperial cult (ancient Rome).

The conversion of Constantine I transformed the relationship of the Christian churches with the Roman military even as it transformed the relationship of the churches with the Roman state. A strongly contrary idea, sometimes called "caesaropapism", identified the now Catholic Empire with the Church militant. The Latin word Christianitas originally meant the body of all Christians conceived as a political body, or the territory of the globe occupied by Christians, something akin to the English word Christendom. Apocalyptic texts were reinterpreted. The idea of a Christian empire continued to play a powerful role in Western Europe even after the collapse of Roman rule there; the name of the Holy Roman Empire bears witness to its claims to sanctity as well as to universal rule. An apocryphal apocalypse of Pseudo-Methodius, written during the seventh century, depicts a saintly Last Roman Emperor who holds his earthly kingdom in anticipation of Christ's return. According to Pseudo-Methodius, the Last Emperor will wage war in the last days against God's enemies, including Gog and Magog and the Antichrist.

Protestantism 
Anglicanism was developed when King Henry VIII established the Church of England as the state church of the Kingdom of England. The Church of England is still closely involved in British politics and disputes sometimes take place over its role. The Hawaiian Kingdom also had an Anglican church as its official state church, the Church of Hawaii in the late 19th century.

Southern Baptistism leans heavily conservative and is involved with the politics of the Republican Party in the United States. Lutheranism is influential in the politics of the Nordic countries. The Church of Denmark, the Church of Iceland, and the Church of Norway are all Lutheran state churches, while the Church of Sweden was a state church until 2000. Calvinism was the official religion of the Netherlands while the Dutch Reformed Church was the state church. The United Methodist Church advocates political activism among Methodists. Methodists in the United States tend to lean conservative or moderate.

Anabaptism adheres to a two kingdom concept. This is the belief that the kingdom of heaven or of Christ (the Church) is different and distinct from the kingdoms of this world. It essentially means the separation of church and state but differs from Protestantism in their belief that the church has no right to interfere in the affairs of the state any more than the state in the church. This viewpoint is still held by the most religiously conservative Anabaptism groups, such as the Amish, Old Order Mennonites, Conservative Mennonites, and Old Order River Brethren. Not all Anabaptist churches subscribe to anarchist ideologies. The Hutterite church traces its roots back to the Radical Reformation and Jacoub Hutter, but respect and adhere to government authority. The Bruderhof, another church community in the Anabaptist tradition, respects the god-given authority of the state, while acknowledging that their ultimate allegiance is to God.

Ideologies

Liberalism 
Separation of church and state is a prominent idea in liberalism, so direct influence of Christianity in liberal politics is typically limited.

Conservatism 
Conservatism in Europe and the Americas is heavily influenced by Christianity. The Christian right within evangelical Christianity has formed many of its political views on social issues such as abortion, homosexuality and public education from passages in both the Old Testament and the New Testament. In the Epistle to the Romans, chapter 13:1-7, Paul instructs Roman Christians to submit to government. See also 1 Peter 2:13-17 and Titus 3:1 for parallels. Mainstream theologians and the Christian right have interpreted Romans 13:1–7 to mean Christians should support the state and wield the sword when necessary, as God has instituted the idea of governments to be his main tool to preserve social order.

Socialism 

The first Jewish Christian communities, as described in the Acts of the Apostles, were organized along a principle of communal ownership of goods. Some expressions of the Christian left have interpreted passages in Acts to mean that an ideal society would be based on Christian socialism or Christian communism. However, passages that have far greater influence for Christians who actively care for the poor are the words of Jesus, usually found in red in most bibles, which appear to give priority to the poor as a Christian obligation.

There are some intentional Christian communities that, inspired by the first Christian church as described in Acts 2 and 4, share all their possessions in an effort to put into action Christ's command to love God and neighbour. The Simple Way, the Bruderhof communities, and the Hutterites are all inspired, to some degree, by the model of church community described in Acts. More common expressions of Christian love and commitment to the poor are churches of all denominations that fund localised soup kitchens, charity shops and shelters for the homeless as well as mission programs overseas. In Roman Catholic circles the doctrine of preference for the poor has been important since 1979 and it still drives the church's practice of hospitality to those in any kind of need.

Anarchism 

More than any other Bible source, the Sermon on the Mount is used as the basis for Christian anarchism. The foundation of Christian anarchism is a rejection of violence, with Leo Tolstoy's The Kingdom of God Is Within You regarded as a key text. Tolstoy takes the viewpoint that all governments who wage war, and churches who in turn support those governments, are an affront to the Christian principles of nonviolence and nonresistance.

Christians have interpreted Romans 13:1–7 to mean they should support the state and wield the sword when requested, as God has sanctified the state to be his main tool to preserve social order. Christian anarchists do not share this interpretation of Romans 13 but given Paul's declaration to submit to authorities they do not attempt to overthrow the state. However anarchists still describe the state as an evil power executing wrath and vengeance. As wrath and vengeance are opposite to the Christian values of returning good for evil, Christian anarchists neither support, nor participate in, the state.

Christian eschatology and various Christian anarchists, such as Jacques Ellul, have identified the State and political power as the Beast in the Book of Revelation. Apocalyptic texts frequently coach radical criticism of existing regimes under the form of allegory; this, at least, is a frequently mentioned interpretation of the Book of Daniel, frequently interpreted by secular scholars as a second-century diatribe against Antiochus IV Epiphanes, who persecuted the Jews and provoked the revolt of the Maccabees. The Book of Revelation contains even more vehement imagery, which many secular scholars believe was directed against the Roman empire. The empire, or the city of Rome itself, are identified by these scholars as the Whore of Babylon, and the Roman emperor becomes the Beast or Antichrist. Both divine punishment and economic and military catastrophe are prophesied against "Babylon", which most scholars agree is John's code name for Rome.

No call to arms is contained within the Christian apocalypse. Instead, the calamities that doom the oppressive regime represented by these allegorical figures are expected from divine intervention alone. Nevertheless, if the books are properly read in this way, they seem to evidence deep hostility to the Roman government, no doubt a reaction to the persecution of Christians by the Roman state.

Libertarianism 

An emerging tradition of political thought, Christian libertarians maintain that state intervention to promote piety or generosity can be unethical and counterproductive. Coercion by threat of violence robs otherwise moral acts of their virtue, inspires resentment and disrespect even for just laws on the part of the coerced, and has a spiritually deleterious effect upon the coercers. As John Chrysostom, late 4th-century Church Father and Archbishop of Constantinople, writes in his work On the Priesthood (Book II, Section 3), For Christians above all men are not permitted forcibly to correct the failings of those who sin. Secular judges indeed, when they have captured malefactors under the law, show their authority to be great, and prevent them even against their will from following their own devices: but in our case the wrong-doer must be made better, not by force, but by persuasion. For neither has authority of this kind for the restraint of sinners been given us by law, nor, if it had been given, should we have any field for the exercise of our power, inasmuch as God rewards those who abstain from evil by their own choice, not of necessity. Consequently much skill is required that our patients may be induced to submit willingly to the treatment prescribed by the physicians, and not only this, but that they may be grateful also for the cure. For if any one when he is bound becomes restive (which it is in his power to be), he makes the mischief worse; and if he should pay no heed to the words which cut like steel, he inflicts another wound by means of this contempt, and the intention to heal only becomes the occasion of a worse disorder. For it is not possible for any one to cure a man by compulsion against his will.

While Christian libertarians disagree over whether and to what extent agents of the state possess the moral authority to intervene in the lives of citizens, government involvement is generally viewed with skepticism and suspicion. As with the Christian left, war and nation-building are common targets of ethical scrutiny from Christians espousing the libertarian philosophy.

The governing maxim for many natural-rights libertarians, including those of faith, is the non-aggression principle, which forbids the initiation of force but does not preclude the restrained, proportional use of defensive or disciplinary violence against the initiator. It has been compared to the Golden Rule and its converse, the Silver Rule. Christian libertarians often defend the institution of private property by pointing to the many Biblical injunctions against theft, to the voluntary nature of faith and the sharing of goods in early Christian communities, and to the fact that Jesus never advocated the redistribution of income and wealth by political means.

According to Christian libertarianism, to seize the life, liberty, or legitimately acquired property of an individual by coercion, even for that person's well-being or for the benefit of others, constitutes a violation of his or her human dignity as an image-bearer of God. Thus, most forms of taxation and all laws that prevent or distort free and nonviolent exchange are unacceptable. The classical doctrine of original or ancestral sin furthermore suggests to Christian libertarians that political (and for some left-libertarians, economic) power ought to be democratically distributed and decentralized to guard against government oppression and the natural human tendency to corruption. In opposition to centralized political authority, Christian libertarians frequently cite the eighth chapter of the Biblical book of 1 Samuel (1 Kings LXX), in which God tells the prophet Samuel that the children of Israel have rejected Him by demanding a king to reign over them, and He describes the many ways such a king will oppress the people.

While one of the Church's societal roles may be to promote righteousness in service and humble obedience to God, equal liberty is the highest or only political value. The state's raison d'être is to prevent rights violations, to quarantine or punish justly, and ideally to restore offenders so they can again peaceably dwell and participate in civil society.

Fascism 

After the onset of fascism in the 1920s and 1930s, several fascist movements adopted Christian ideas. Notable Christian fascist movements include the Fatherland Front in Austria and the Rexist Party in Belgium.

See also 

 Caesaropapism
 Catholic Church and politics in the United States
 Christian communism
 Christian democracy
 Distributism
 Social credit
 Christian left
 Christian libertarianism
 Christian pacifism
 Christian Reconstructionism
 Christian republic
 Christian right
 Christian socialism
 Doctrine of the two kingdoms
 Dominion Theology
 European Christian Political Movement
 Judaism and politics
 Liberation theology
 Political Catholicism
 Political theology
 Progressive Christianity
 Religion in politics
 Symphonia (theology)
 Temporal power of the Holy See

References

Further reading 
 Mill, John Stuart. On Liberty: A Translation into Modern English. ISR Publications, 2013. "Editorial foreword: Christianity and liberty". 
 John Howard Yoder, The Politics of Jesus (1972)
 "Politics", entry in The Oxford Companion to Christian Thought, Adrian Hastings, Alistair Mason, and Hugh Pyper, editors. (Oxford, 2000) 
 McKendry R. Langley, The Politics of Political Spirituality: Episodes from the Public Career of Abraham Kuyper, 1879-1918 (Jordan Station, Ont.: Paideia Press, 1984) 
 
 Obery M. Hendricks Jr., The Politics of Jesus: Rediscovering the True Revolutionary Nature of Jesus' Teachings and How They Have Been Corrupted (2006)
 C. C. Pecknold, Christianity and Politics: A Brief Guide to the History (Cascade, 2010)

External links 

 A Modern Christian Political Organization
 The Christian and the Authorities
 Radio Interview with Dr. Stephen Bede Scharper: A Political Theology of the Environment, University of Toronto, 3 October 2008.

 
Christianity-related controversies